Victorino (Las calles no se siembran) ("Victorino (The Streets are Not Planted)") is a 1973 Mexican film. It was directed by Gustavo Alatriste.

External links
 

1973 films
Mexican adventure drama films
1970s Spanish-language films
Films directed by Gustavo Alatriste
1970s Mexican films